Frugoni is a surname originating in Italy. Notable people with the surname include:

Arsenio Frugoni (1914–1970), Italian historian
Carlo Innocenzo Frugoni (1692–1768), Italian poet and librettist
Chiara Frugoni (born 1940), Italian historian
Gian Bernardo Frugoni (1591–1661), Genoese doge
Emilio Frugoni (1880–1969), Uruguayan politician
Pietro Frugoni (1851–1940), Italian general
Ramiro Martínez (rugby union) (born 1970), Argentine-born rugby union player, also known as Ramiro Martinez-Frugoni

Italian-language surnames